Project Manhigh was a pre-Space Age military project that took men in balloons to the middle layers of the stratosphere, funded as an aero-medical research program, though seen by its designers as a stepping stone to space. It was conducted by the United States Air Force between 1955 and 1958.

History
The project started in December 1955 to study the effects of cosmic rays on humans. Three balloon flights to the stratosphere were made during the program:

The balloon was launched from South St. Paul Airport and the flight was cut short due to one of the capsule's valves being installed backwards which vented the oxygen supply outside, but not before reaching a record altitude of 96,784 feet.

Candidates for the Manhigh project were put through a series of physical and psychological tests that became the standard for qualifying astronauts for the Project Mercury, America's first manned orbital space program.

Similar projects in which men in a gondola reached near-space altitudes were performed by Swiss physicist Auguste Piccard and Paul Kipfer, reaching  in 1931, USSR-1 piloted by Georgy Prokofiev reaching  in 1933, and Osoaviakhim-1 reaching  in 1934.

See also
 John Stapp
Project Excelsior, follow-on flights in 1959 and 1960
Flight altitude record

References

Further reading

External links
 Details of Manhigh I, Manhigh II flight, and Manhigh III at stratocat.com.ar
 Space Men (American Experience episode)

Ballooning
Space research
Human subject research in the United States
Military projects of the United States